The 2005 Indonesia food scare was a food scare in 2005 in Jakarta, Indonesia, when the government found that 60% of noodle shops in the capital had been serving noodles laced with formaldehyde, a known carcinogen. Noodles in the 2007 Vietnam food scare also had the same contaminant, and the chemical preservative had also definitely been found on tofu, noodles, and salted fish.  Thailand has similar formaldehyde problems. Rumors spread that it was used on chicken as well.  This was particularly bad in a nation like Indonesia where chicken is widely consumed because of the Islamic stance on pork.

Other food contaminants found by Depok Health agency in elementary schools in 2006 were sodium benzoate, cyclamate and borax exceeding the permissible levels. Benzoate and cyclamate were commonly used as food additives in Indonesia. Other substances found in the samples, such as borax, rhodamine, formaldehyde and Methyl yellow —used as a dye—are not fit for consumption.

See also
 Food contamination
 2008 Chinese milk scandal

References

External links
Formaldehyde found in school snacks 

Food safety scandals
Indonesia Food Scare, 2005
Food scares
2000s in Jakarta
2005 health disasters
Health disasters in Indonesia